The 1989 Volvo International was a men's tennis tournament played on outdoor hard courts at the Stratton Mountain Resort in Stratton Mountain, Vermont, United States, and was part of the 1989 Nabisco Grand Prix. The tournament ran from July 31 through August 7, 1989. Brad Gilbert won the singles title.

Finals

Singles

 Brad Gilbert defeated  Jim Pugh 7–5, 6–0 
 It was Gilbert's 2nd title of the year and the 16th of his career.

Doubles

 Mark Kratzmann /  Wally Masur defeated  Pieter Aldrich /  Danie Visser 6–3, 4–6, 7–6 
 It was Kratzmann's 2nd title of the year and the 7th of his career. It was Masur's 2nd title of the year and the 12th of his career.

References

External links
 ITF – Stratton Mountain tournament details